Alex Newcombe Walkinshaw (born 5 October 1974) is a British actor. He has played the long-running roles of Dale "Smithy" Smith in the ITV police procedural series The Bill and Adrian "Fletch" Fletcher in BBC medical dramas Casualty and Holby City.  He also played PE teacher Jez Diamond in BBC school-based drama series Waterloo Road.

Career
Walkinshaw's first television appearance was at the age of 12 as an extra in Grange Hill, where he stayed for a year. From 1992 to 1993 he appeared in the sitcom Side by Side.

He first appeared in The Bill in three episodes as a guest star in 1992, 1993 and 1995, before joining as a regular cast member in 1999. It was whilst he was acting at the Royal Court Theatre that he was spotted by one of the producers of The Bill and was encouraged to audition for the programme. He joined The Bill as PC Dale Smith, better known as "Smithy" and then left in 2001. In 2003, he returned when his character was promoted to Sergeant.  When The Bill was axed in Scotland in 2009 by STV, Walkinshaw was the last person to appear on Scottish screens alongside Sam Callis as Sgt Callum Stone.

After The Bill was axed in 2010 by ITV, Walkinshaw admitted that "It was emotional shooting the final scenes" and that he found it "tough" to leave behind some of his co-stars.

He has previously admitted that he would be keen to appear in the soap, EastEnders.

In 2011, Walkinshaw was cast in Waterloo Road as PE teacher, Jeremy 'Jez' Diamond, replacing Paul Nicholls. Following his departure from the show, he joined the cast of Casualty as nurse, Adrian 'Fletch' Fletcher. In 2014, the character made a permanent switch from Casualty to its sister show Holby City.

Awards
In 2008, he was nominated for Outstanding Drama Performance at the National Television Awards. The award was won by David Tennant.

Early and personal life
Walkinshaw was born on 5 October 1974 in Barking, Essex. In between acting jobs in the 1990s, he also worked as a labourer, office fitter and at a snooker hall in Barking.

During his time on The Bill, Walkinshaw met his wife Sarah, who worked as a make-up artist on the show. They married on 20 June 2009 at the Queen's House in Greenwich, London and live in Kent with their two children.

He is very close friends with his former co-stars Roberta Taylor and René Zagger. Taylor is like a second mother to him and is even grandmother by proxy to his children. Zagger is his best friend and they have known each other since they were 15 and 16; they also shared a flat when they were both on The Bill. Zagger and Scott Maslen were his best men at his wedding. His cousin is the glamour model and TV personality Jodie Marsh.

He is a West Ham United supporter and enjoys programmes such as CSI: Crime Scene Investigation and Doctor Who.

He undertakes local charity work and is the patron for the St Thomas' Lupus Trust.
On 24 March 2007, he took part in The Weakest Link and won £9,450, which he donated to Essex-based charity "Kids in Need", which grants wishes for underprivileged, sick and terminally ill children.
On 2 May 2007, he opened a new community police office in Chislehurst, for the Safer Neighbourhood teams from Chislehurst and Mottingham.

Filmography

Film
 Saving Santa (2013)

Television

References

External links

1974 births
Living people
English male television actors
People from Barking, London
Male actors from London